Souvenirs de Munich is a quadrille on themes from Wagner's Tristan and Isolde, for piano, four hands by Emmanuel Chabrier.

Background
Chabrier's interest in Wagner dated from 1862, when as a study exercise he copied out the score of Tannhäuser. In early 1880 he requested time off from his ministry job to visit Munich that March with Duparc and other friends to go to a performance of Tristan und Isolde as it could only be seen there. The experience was a musical revelation for Chabrier. Chabrier, as assistant to Charles Lamoureux, helped in the rehearsals for the concert performances in Paris of Act I (1884) and Act II (1885) of Tristan und Isolde.

However, much as he admired the music of Wagner, he was still able to create musical parodies of the German composer. Chabrier regularly improvised works of this kind at the piano; Delage describes an evening dinner at the home of Lamoureux where an improvisation on themes from The Ring enraged von Bülow. Poulenc described Souvenirs de Munich as "irresistibly funny", where Wagner's principal themes appear with "false beards and fake moustaches".

The exact date of the creation of Souvenirs de Munich is unknown, but it probably dates from 1887. Possibly with Offenbach's satire Le musicien de l'avenir in mind, it led to Fauré and Messager's 'Souvenirs de Bayreuth' in similar vein.

Music
The five movements follow the traditional layout of a musical quadrille
 Pantalon (C major, 2/4) uses themes of the sailors’ greeting to King Marke (Act 1), the Kareol leitmotif (Act III) 
 Eté (G major, 2/4) uses themes of Ecstasy, Love call, Love song (Act II)
 Poule (C major, 6/8) uses themes of the shepherd's joyful tune (Act III), death song (Act II)
 Pastourelle (D major, 2/4) uses themes of Kurwenal's song
 Galop (F major, 2/4) Sailor's doleful song (Act I), Kurwenal's aria (Act I) and Longing for death (Act II)

References

Compositions for piano four-hands
1887 compositions
Compositions by Emmanuel Chabrier